Karel Van Hassel (14 September 1904 – 12 June 1989) was a Belgian racing cyclist. He rode in the 1929 Tour de France.

References

1904 births
1989 deaths
Belgian male cyclists
Place of birth missing